Betty Jamerson Reed (born 1937) is a researcher, author and retired educator in the United States.

Early life and education 
She is a native of western North Carolina. She graduated from Bryan College in Dayton, Tennessee. She taught History, English, and Spanish at East Henderson High School, Brevard High School, and Rosman High School and has also been an instructor at Blue Ridge Community College, Mars Hill College, Brevard College, and Western Carolina University.

Career 
She surveyed Rosenwald Schools in southwestern North Carolina for the State Archives Department in 2002. Reed authored The Brevard Rosenwald School; Black Education and Community Building in a Southern Appalachian Town, 1920-1966 in 2004. The book generally received praise from reviewers. The Brevard Rosenwald School had also been the subject of her dissertation.

In 2011, she published School Segregation in Western North Carolina, A History, 1860s-1970s. In 2012 she was honored by the American Association of State and Local History for her book. In 2019, Reed published Soldiers in Petticoats.

She also writes poetry, and her work has been included in anthologies. She lives in Transylvania County, North Carolina.

Selected bibliography

Articles
"Sequoyah, the Son of a Virginian”, The Virginia Writers Journal. July 2022.

References

History of education in the United States
Scholars of American education
Historians of the Reconstruction Era
Historians of African Americans

1937 births
Living people
People from North Carolina